A guilty pleasure is something one enjoys despite feeling guilt for it.

Guilty pleasure(s) may also refer to:

Literature 
 Guilty Pleasures (novel), a 1993 novel by Laurell K. Hamilton
 Guilty Pleasures, a 1998 novel by Lawrence Sanders
 Guilty Pleasures, a 2008 novel by Tasmina Perry

Music

Albums
 Guilty Pleasure (Ashley Tisdale album) or the title song, 2009
 Guilty Pleasure (Attila album) or the title song, 2014
 Guilty Pleasure (Brokencyde album), 2011
 Guilty Pleasures (Barbra Streisand album), 2005
 Guilty Pleasures (Didrik Solli-Tangen album), 2010
 Guilty Pleasures (Lazlo Bane album), 2007
 Guilty Pleasures (Quiet Riot album) or the title song, 2001
 Guilty Pleasures, by the 77s, 2003
 Guilty Pleasures, an EP by Allister, 2006
 Guilty Pleasures, an EP by George Watsky, 2010

Songs
 "Guilty Pleasure" (Mia Dimšić song), 2022
 "Guilty Pleasure", by Cobra Starship from ¡Viva la Cobra!, 2007
 "Guilty Pleasure", by Elton John from Wonderful Crazy Night, 2015

Other
 Guilty Pleasure Tour, a 2011–2012 concert tour by Meat Loaf
 Guilty Pleasures, a concept, radio show, club night and series of compilations devised by Sean Rowley

Television and film 
 Guilty Pleasures (TV series), a television series aired on Food Network
 "Guilty Pleasure" (NCIS), an episode of NCIS
 "Guilty Pleasures" (Glee), an episode of Glee
 "Guilty Pleasures" (Top Chef), an episode of Top Chef
 "Guilty Pleasures", a series of episodes of the Food Network show The Best Thing I Ever Ate
 Virgin Territory (working title: Guilty Pleasures), a 2007 film
 Guilty Pleasures (2009 film), a 2009 film starring Ramsey Nouah, Majid Michel, Nse Ikpe Etim and Omoni Oboli